Tales from the Poop Deck is a CITV children's comedy programme about Connie Blackheart's adventures as a pirate, and her battles with Admiral De'Ath. It is set in the 18th century. Premiering in April 1992 with 25-minute episodes, it was cancelled later that same year.

Episode List
Here Be Pirates
Traitors and Treasure
Marooned
The Fog Of The Dead
Mutiny
Till Death Us Do Part

References

External links

1992 British television series debuts
1992 British television series endings
1990s British children's television series
ITV children's television shows
ITV comedy
Television series about pirates
1990s British television miniseries
Television series by Fremantle (company)
Television series by ITV Studios
Television shows produced by Central Independent Television
English-language television shows